Darjan Petrič (born August 24, 1964 in Kranj, Slovenia) is a former Yugoslav freestyle swimmer of Slovene ethnicity, who represented Yugoslavia in three consecutive Summer Olympics, starting in 1980. He is the brother of swimmer Borut Petrič, the youngest participant (14 years, 325 days) at the 1976 Summer Olympics in Montreal, Quebec, Canada.

At the 1987 Summer Universiade in Zagreb, Petrič won two silver medals in the 400 and 1500-metre freestyle.

In 2010, he was a candidate in the election for the mayor of City Municipality of Kranj, but failed to pass the first round, receiving 16,92% votes.

References
 

1964 births
Living people
Yugoslav male freestyle swimmers
Slovenian male freestyle swimmers
Swimmers at the 1980 Summer Olympics
Swimmers at the 1984 Summer Olympics
Swimmers at the 1988 Summer Olympics
Olympic swimmers of Yugoslavia
Slovenian twins
Sportspeople from Kranj
World Aquatics Championships medalists in swimming
Twin sportspeople
European Aquatics Championships medalists in swimming
Mediterranean Games gold medalists for Yugoslavia
Swimmers at the 1983 Mediterranean Games
Universiade medalists in swimming
Mediterranean Games medalists in swimming
Universiade silver medalists for Yugoslavia
Medalists at the 1987 Summer Universiade